Our Love is a 2000 Hungarian drama film directed by József Pacskovszky. It was entered into the 22nd Moscow International Film Festival.

Cast
 Melinda Major as Emmi
 Lajos Bertók as Légoza László
 Erik Desfosses as Alex
 Jan Kidawa-Blonski as Grund
 Teréz Rudolf as Éva
 Marzena Trybala as Madeleina
 Margit Földessy as Dusi
 Eszter Balla as Sabine
 Emese Vasvári as Marie
 István Göz as Pap
 Fidel Atya as Atya

References

External links
 

2000 films
2000 drama films
Hungarian drama films
2000s Hungarian-language films